Theophilus Eaton (January 7, 1658) was a wealthy New England Puritan merchant and diplomat, who became 1st Governor of New Haven Colony, Connecticut, co founder of that same colony and co founder of the Massachusetts Bay Colony. His brother, Nathaniel Eaton, was the first Head of Harvard.

Early life and first marriage
He was born at Stony Stratford, Buckinghamshire, England about 1590,  to Rev. Richard Eaton and his wife, Elizabeth. His father was a graduate of the University of Oxford in 1599, at Lincoln College, and may have been the curate at that time. He later became in 1607 Prebendary of Lincoln Cathedral and Vicar of Great Budworth, Cheshire.  Theophilus married Grace Hiller, and had at least a daughter (Mary), and a son (Samuel) before her death (some authorities think that he also had a son by the name of James).

Second marriage and children

In 1625 he remarried, this time to a widow, Anne Yale, who was the daughter of George Lloyd, the Bishop of Chester (some authorities say Anne Morton, the daughter of Bishop Thomas Morton of Chester). The couple had three children (Theophilus, Hannah, and Elizabeth), but the household raised eight children. Besides their three, and Mary and Samuel, it included Anne, David, and Thomas Yale from Anne's first marriage to Thomas Yale of the Yale family. Thomas Yale was a London merchant, son of Dr. David Yale of Erddig Park, Chancellor of Chester, who was the nephew of Dr. Thomas Yale, Chancellor of the Head of the Church of England for Elizabeth Tudor and was a grandson of John Lloyd, Judge of the High Court of Admiralty in London, and one of the eight founding Fellows of the first Protestant College of the University of Oxford, Jesus College.

The three Yale children all had notable places in the history of Connecticut. Thomas Yale Jr. settled in Connecticut as a planter and landowner, cofounded New Haven Colony, and signed its Fundamental Agreement on June 4, 1639. His descendants would fight the American Revolutionary War and other wars, as General, Colonels, Majors, Captains and soldiers, and become the early settlers of Wallingford and Yalesville, with many also becoming postmasters for Presidents Jackson, Van Buren, Polk, Pierce, and Buchanan, as well as establishing a manufacturing dynasty in the region. Their manufacturing businesses would produce cigars, Britannia ware, cutlery, scythes as well as bayonets and muskets for the Revolutionary War, Mexican War, Crimean War, and would later be behind the majority of the weapons manufactured for the Union Army of Abraham Lincoln during the Civil War. Anne Yale (the daughter) married Governor Edward Hopkins in 1631; he later became the 2nd Governor of Connecticut and a Lord Commissioner of the Admiralty for the Lord Protector of Britain, Oliver Cromwell.  David Yale, a prosperous Boston merchant and attorney to Robert Rich, 2nd Earl of Warwick, who married Ursula Knight in 1641, became the father of Governor Elihu Yale,  President of the British East India Company settlement in Fort St. George, at Madras and primary benefactor of Yale College.

Governor Eaton's five children fared as follows.  Daughter Mary Eaton married Judge Valentine Hill of Boston, a Business associate of William Aspinwall, member of the Artillery Company, signatory of the Oath of a Freeman and real estate developer in 1647. (His brother, Nathaniel Eaton, the first headmaster of Harvard and builder of Harvard's first College was present as a witness.) Samuel Eaton became one of the seven founding members and signatories of the Harvard Corporation by charter in 1650, then, in 1654, married Mabel (Harlakenden) Haynes, widow of John Haynes, 4th Governor of Massachusetts Bay Colony and later 1st Governor of Connecticut Colony. Both of them died in the small pox epidemic of 1655. Hannah Eaton married William Jones, 24th Lieutenant Governor of Connecticut and Magistrate for the United Colonies, in 1659. He and Davenport hosted in secret two regicides from Britain in the Judges' Cave in New Haven. Theophilus Eaton, Jr., or Ellis, as he was known, returned to England with his mother after his father's death, settled in Dublin, Ireland, and married Catherine (daughter of Captain Thomas Maunsell and Alphra Crayford) in 1649, and their daughter Anne married Colonel Thomas Maunsell.  Their daughter Elizabeth died in London in March 1637 before the family departed for the colonies.

Early career in England

In London, Theophilus resided between Coleman Street and Lothbury Street, and became a member of the Court of Common Council of the City of London Corporation. For several years, he served as Ambassador and middleman between King James I of England and King Christian IV of Denmark, mostly for the business dealings between these two countries. Then he would become Deputy Governor of the Eastland Company, which was one of the great trading companies in the Baltics and Scandinavia, dealing with countries such as Norway, Sweden, Prussia and Poland. As his wealth grew, he took great interest in the plans to colonize New England. He would get his chance in 1628. He and a group of shareholders, including Sir Richard Saltonstall and Sir Henry Rosewell, bought the right to colonize the Massachusetts Bay Colony, through a Royal charter made by King Charles I of England.

As one of the cofounders of Massachusetts, he signed its incorporation called the Charter of the Massachusetts Bay Company and they would form a Self-governing colony by creating the Massachusetts General Court, called the Great and General Court at the time and the Massachusetts Governor's Council, called the Council of assistants at the time. This governing body would put the management and defence of the colony in the hands of ten men. Five would have to stay in England, five would go to Massachusetts. Theophilus was one of the five men chosen to govern the Colony from England. To make the trip to the Massachusetts Bay Colony, Governor John Winthrop would use one of the ships that he co-owned, the Arbella, and would make it his flagship to lead the Winthrop Fleet. Arrived in Massachusetts, they would make Boston their capital. This would start the Puritan migration to New England (1620–1640) and Theophilus would be one of those wealthy city Puritans who financed it. The colony became the largest and most powerful in New England, and evolved into the Thirteen American Colonies that would later become the United States of America.

Emigration to New England
He later made the trip and emigrated to New England with other Puritans in the ship Hector, arriving in Boston on June 26, 1637.

His group of colonists had John Davenport as their religious leader, and they wanted to start their own settlement – probably due in part to the commanding persona of John Winthrop, Governor of the Massachusetts Bay Colony at the time (1637 to 1640, and many other terms). Winthrop was termed "an object of great fear in all the colonies", and caused the Rev. Thomas Hooker and others to go off and form their own colonies as well. Their beliefs seemed quite strong in retrospect as they would later refuse the request of Oliver Cromwell, the most powerful man in England, to join him in his conquest of Ireland and Spain.

Foundation of New Haven
In the spring his group moved from Boston and when they arrived on April 14, 1638 they named the site New Haven.

That fall, Eaton led an exploration to the south, and located a site at Quinnipiack on the northern shore of Long Island Sound. On November 14, 1638, he and his company entered into an agreement with the chief sachem Momauquin agreeing that in exchange for protection from the Quinnipiack Indians' ancient enemies, the Mohawk and the Pequot, Momauquin would relinquish his right, title, and interest to the lands that both parties agreed would not later evolve into feelings of animosity, hate, or regret. [Cf. J. W. Barber, History and Antiquities of New Haven, (Conn.) (1831) pp. 25–29].

The Mohawks and the Pequots had all but wiped out the New Haven Indians, leaving but 40 surviving males, and to that end Theophilus and his company also covenanted to protect them when unreasonably assaulted and terrified, that they would always have a sufficient quantity of land to plant on, and by way of free and thankful retribution that they give to the sachem and his council and company: twelve coats of English cloth, twelve alchemy spoons, twelve hatchets, twelve hoes, two dozen knives, twelve porringers, and four cases of French knives & scissors.

This agreement was signed and legally executed by Momauquin and his council as well as by Theophilus Eaton and John Davenport.

Some still say, however, that Theophilus simply traded thirteen coats to the local Indians for seven townships of land; but what is a fact is that in the following December 1638 he and his company did also purchase the usage of a large area of land from Monotowese, son of the sachem at Mattabeseck, which was 10 miles in length and 13 in breadth. He did pay 13 coats to Monotowese as per their agreement, but again, the English gave the Indians ample grounds to plant on and free usage of all the lands for hunting. Further, even though Monotowese's tribe consisted of but 10 males with their women and children, it was understood that the English would also protect them from the Mohawk and the Pequots.

Upon arrival in the new colony, Theophilus at first attempted to resume his trade as a merchant.
He was not successful, however, since the colony was too new to afford imports and the Indian fur trade was more successful at the Dutch outposts at Hartford, so he soon turned to farming.

When the New Haven Colony established its administration, he was chosen as one of the "seven pillars of the church" acting as one of the 7 councillors who formed the body of freemen and elected civil officers.

Their names were: Theophilus Eaton, John Davenport, Robert Newman, Matthew Gilbert, Thomas Fugill, John Punderson, and Jeremiah Dixon.

Career as governor

He was elected as the first governor on June 4, 1639 and reelected each year until his death on January 7, 1657/8 (Julian Calendar timing). He was buried on the green in New Haven and later his remains were removed to Grove Street Cemetery, New Haven. One of his major accomplishments as governor was the creation of a written legal code for the colony in 1655 later to be known as the Blue Laws of Connecticut. For this, and the fact that he was the first president of the Massachusetts Bay Company, he is sometimes thought of as being the Father of American Law, but this is arguably an example of hyperbole.

In 1640, as Governor of the Colony, he acquired from the Siwanoy indians the town of Greenwich, Connecticut, making him one of its founder. Around 1642, he established the Delaware Company of New Haven, a permanent colony in the Delaware River Valley with the aim of developing the fur trade against the Dutch. Stephen Goodyear of the Goodyear family and other merchants joined the venture. Their claim on this territory brought conflicts with Dutch Governor Willem Kieft and Lord Baltimore of Maryland Colony.

In 1643, he became a founding Commissioner of the United Colonies of New England, and was joined by his son-in-law, Governor Edward Hopkins, the 2nd Governor of Connecticut Colony, to unite the Church and build a military alliance between the New England Colonies. In 1646, he became the first in New England to freed his slaves, more than 100 years before the 1st U.S. President George Washington and Founding Father Benjamin Franklin doing the same.<ref> 1999 Facts about blacks: A source of African-American achievement. Edition 2, Madison books, 1996, p. 53.</ref> In 1650, he became involved in one of the many disputes with Gov. Peter Stuyvesant, of the Stuyvesant family, over the boundaries of the colonies, adding tension to the Anglo-Dutch relations.

The dispute with New Amsterdam concerned the Dutch claims on all the lands bordering Long Island Sound, and the capture of an English ship. Gov. Winthrop got involved and they settled the borders of New Netherland and the English colonies over the Treaty of Hartford (1650). In 1653, he sent his Secretary, Francis Newman, to meet Governor Peter Stuyvesant to gain compensation for the English settlers who were in Dutch hands. Mr. Newman would replace Theophilus Eaton as Governor after his death in 1658. 

His house was the biggest of the Colony, and one of the biggest in New England at the time, with a total of 21 fireplaces, a household of about 30 people, and an estate covering 3000 acres in New Haven.Sarah Day Woodward's "Early New Haven," Chapter to Ann Lloyd Yale Eaton. He also had estates in London and England. The home of Eli Whitney of the Whitney family, now called William Pinto House, would later be on the original estate of Gov. Eaton.

Eaton's Neck, New York, on Long Island, a peninsula 45 miles from Manhattan, also bear his name. He acquired the land in 1646 from the Matinecock Indians and was the first European to have explored this area. As part of the estate of Gov. Eaton and Anne Yale, the 1500 acres property was inherited by their son, Theophilus Jr., then their daughter Hannah Eaton, the half-siblings of the Yales. In 1686, it became one of the six Royal manors of Long Island, becoming The Lordship and Manor of Eaton’s Neck. It was granted by Governor Thomas Dongan on behalf of King James II of England, the famous Duke of York who gave his name to the Province and City of New York.

Siblings
Theophilus' younger brother Nathaniel Eaton (1609–1674) was the first headmaster of Harvard College. He was deposed in 1639 by the then Governor John Winthrop in what some have considered to be Massachusetts' first Witch Trial. Another brother, Samuel Eaton Sr. (1597–1665), was a Minister who accompanied Theophilus to New Haven, but later returned to England.

Theophilus was a member of the Great and General Court of the Massachusetts Bay Colony when they issued the charter for Harvard. He also gave £40 for the erection of Harvard's first buildings while his brother Nathaniel Eaton was erecting them as superintendent of the college. Governor Eaton, his brother Nathaniel, the first President designate, and his son Samuel Jr., one of the seven founders of the Harvard Corporation, were all cofounders of Harvard College.

Epitaph
Theophilus' epitaph reads as follows ...

See also
 New Haven, Connecticut
 History of Connecticut
 Robert Seeley
 Louisa Caroline Huggins Tuthill
 Descendants of Thomas Yale

References

Notes

 Yale, Rodney Horace (1908). Yale Genealogy and History of Wales''. Beatrice, Nebraska, U.S.A. Milburn & Scott Company. Listed in Worldcat and archived at the Internet Archive.

External links
New Haven's Fundamental Agreement

1658 deaths
Year of birth uncertain
American Puritans
People from the Borough of Milton Keynes
New England Puritanism
People of colonial Connecticut
Burials at Grove Street Cemetery
Politicians from New Haven, Connecticut
Colonial governors of Connecticut
Kingdom of England emigrants to Massachusetts Bay Colony